Walter Scott (1844 – 7 October 1890) was a member of the Queensland Legislative Assembly. To the people of Bundaberg, he was known as "Honest George".

Biography
Scott was born at Castlereagh River, New South Wales, the son of Simon Scott and his wife Christina (née Swanson). After his arrival in Queensland he was a station proprietor and manager.

In 1875, he married Mary Catherine Martin and together had three sons and two daughters. Scott died in October 1890 at Taromeo.

Public career
Scott represented the Queensland Legislative Assembly seats of Burnett from 1871 until 1873 and Mulgrave from 1873 until 1878.

References

Members of the Queensland Legislative Assembly
1844 births
1890 deaths
19th-century Australian politicians